William Harrington (1566 – executed 18 February 1594) was an English Jesuit priest. He is a Roman Catholic martyr, beatified in 1929.

Life

His father had entertained Edmund Campion at the ancestral home, Mount St. John, early in 1581. Young William, inspired by Campion, went abroad to train as a priest. He was first at the seminary at Reims, then went to study under the Jesuits at Tournai (1582–1584). He would have joined the order, but his health broke down and forced him to keep at home for the next six years.

In February 1591, however, he was able to return once more to Reims, and, having been ordained, returned at midsummer 1592. The following May he fell into the hands of the English authorities, whereupon he was arrested and confined to the dungeons for several months.  
Harrington was sentenced to be hanged, drawn and quartered at Tyburn for the crime of being a Catholic priest. He was given the chance to spare his life if he renounced the Catholic faith and were to attend Protestant services just once. William refused.  He was tortured on the rack, hanged until not quite dead, then disemboweled, before being beheaded.

William's fate had an important literary side-effect. One of those who had sheltered him was Henry Donne, the brother of the poet John Donne. Henry was arrested, and died of the plague in Newgate Prison. John Donne was a Catholic too, but later embraced the Protestant Church of England, in an effort to spare his own life.

William Harrington was beatified in 1929 by Pope Pius XI. His Feast Day is 18 February. He is also venerated on 22 November as one of the Martyrs of England, Scotland and Wales and on 29 October as one of the Martyrs of Douai.

Bibliography 

 Commendacions of Matrymony, cir. 1528

References

Attribution

The Month, April, 1874, 411-423
Samuel Harsnet, Declaration of egregious Popish Impostures, whereunto are annexed the confessions of the parties themselves (London, 1603), 230-232
Academy (London, 19 February 1876), 165
John Morris, Troubles of our Catholic Forefathers (London, 1875), 104-107

1566 births
1594 deaths
English beatified people
16th-century venerated Christians
16th-century English Jesuits
People executed under Elizabeth I by hanging, drawing and quartering
Executed English people
People executed at Tyburn
One Hundred and Seven Martyrs of England and Wales